= Pizza with Shrimp on Top =

Play written by Aaron Levy

Pizza with Shrimp on Top is a young adult play written by Aaron Levy.

== Plot ==
Stuart attempted suicide by overdose and is now trapped between life and death. Stuart meets Daniel, B.J., and Muggy, limbo’s "welcoming committee," and then runs into Lisa, an old crush from his school. When his little sister Stephanie visits him at the hospital, Stuart realizes that his time has run out, and he needs to make the choice between life and death.

== Publication ==
It was published on 17 October 2006 by Dramatic Publishing.
